The Porter Portland is a hotel operated by Hilton Worldwide in Portland, Oregon, as part of its Curio Collection.

Establishments within the hotel included Chiosco, Portland Exchange Grocer & Goods, Terrane Italian Kitchen + Bar, and Xport Bar & Lounge.

References

External links
 
 
 The Porter Portland, Curio Collection by Hilton at Hilton.com

Hilton Worldwide
Hotels in Portland, Oregon
Southwest Portland, Oregon